Queenborough railway station is on the Sheerness Line, on the Isle of Sheppey in northern Kent, and serves the town of Queenborough.

Train services are provided by Southeastern.

Facilities
On Platform 2 (Sheerness bound), there is a substantial and historic two-storey building which contains a ticket office on the ground floor; this is staffed on a part-time basis. There is a self-service ticket machine by the side gate beside the station building to Platform 2. New train information displays with announcements have been installed on each platform replacing the old display on platform 1 which used to show trains in both directions. There are also signals at either end of each platform so if there was a problem with one of the platforms, trains could use the other for services in either direction.

Services
All services at Queenborough are operated by Southeastern using  EMUs.

The typical off-peak service in trains per hour is:
 1 tph to 
 1 tph to 

During the peak hours, the service is increased to 2 tph.

History
The line was worked from the outset by the London, Chatham and Dover Railway which absorbed the S&SR in 1876.

There was no direct connection with the Sheerness Line and trains for Leysdown departed from the outer face of a newly constructed island platform at Queenborough. An iron footbridge was erected at the southern end of the platforms to facilitate passengers changing between main line and branch services. Services on the Sheppey Light Railway ceased as from 4 December 1950.

Until the opening of Swale Halt in 1922, Queenborough was the only intermediate station on the Sheerness Line. The imposing two-storey station building has a strong Victorian character with their high-pitched gables and round-headed sash windows. The building is in a similar style to Lymington Town railway station which dates from the same period, a resemblance which may be explained by the fact that the construction of both the Lymington Branch Line and the S&SR was overseen by John Cass Birkinshaw who was replaced as engineer on the S&SR after the company's directors blamed him for the line's slow construction.

A wooden waiting shelter was provided on the Up side but not on the Down side. The station also had a sizeable goods shed and goods yard on the Up side adjacent to the main station building. Sidings on the Down side served the Sheerness Steel plant and provided connections for MCD car traffic and shipbreaking activities. There was a signal box on the Up side which was located at the point where the Sheppey branch curved away to the east; this closed on 24 May 1959. By this time, the goods shed had already been demolished although the goods yard remained open until 16 August 1971. The line through Queenborough was electrified and the platforms were lengthened in 1959 as part of phase I of the Kent Coast Electrification.

By 1993, much of the station building was no longer in use and only the booking office was staffed on weekdays until mid-morning.

References

References

Sources

External links

Railway stations in Swale
DfT Category E stations
Former London, Chatham and Dover Railway stations
Railway stations in Great Britain opened in 1860
Railway stations served by Southeastern
Isle of Sheppey